The D.C. Women's Hall of Fame (also District of Columbia Women's Hall of Fame) was a project supported by the D.C. Commission for Women and meant to honor the achievements of women from the District of Columbia. Eight women were inducted into the hall of fame in its first year, 1988. Women were chosen for making "significant contributions in the fields of community and public service, education, health or labor." The hall of fame can be seen in the Dr. Mildred E. Gibbs lecture hall at the Charles Sumner School.

List of inductees

References

External links 
 D.C. Women's Hall of Fame Award

1988 establishments in Washington, D.C.
Women's halls of fame
Halls of fame in Washington, D.C.
Awards established in 1988
Women in Washington, D.C.